Rennico Clarke (born 26 August 1995) is a Jamaican footballer who last played for Charleston Battery in the USL Championship.

Career

Professional
Clarke began his professional career with Harbour View.  He made seven appearances and scored one goal for the club before joining USL expansion side Portland Timbers 2 on 19 February 2015.  He made his debut for the club on 29 March 2015 in a 3–1 victory over Real Monarchs SLC.

Clarke was released by Portland on 9 February 2018.

In April 2018 Clarke joined the Iceland team FH.

In July 2019, Clarke signed with USL Championship club Swope Park Rangers.

In February 2020, Clarke joined Charleston Battery.

International
Clarke represented Jamaica at the 2015 CONCACAF U-20 Championship.

References

External links

1995 births
Living people
Jamaican footballers
Jamaica youth international footballers
Jamaican expatriate footballers
Harbour View F.C. players
Portland Timbers 2 players
Portland Timbers players
Fimleikafélag Hafnarfjarðar players
Sporting Kansas City II players
USL Championship players
Association football defenders
Expatriate soccer players in the United States
2015 CONCACAF U-20 Championship players
Jamaica under-20 international footballers